The Abyssinian War Medal was awarded for service between 4 October 1867 and 19 April 1868 to those who participated in the 1868 Expedition to Abyssinia.  This punitive expedition, led by Lieutenant-General Sir Robert Napier, was carried out by the armed forces of the British Empire against the Ethiopian Empire. Emperor Tewodros II of Ethiopia imprisoned several missionaries and two representatives of the British government. The punitive expedition launched by the British in response required transporting a sizable military force hundreds of miles across mountainous terrain lacking any road system.

About 14,000 medals were awarded, 12,000 to the British and Indian armies and 1,981 to the Royal Navy. In addition to members of the Naval Brigade which accompanied the expedition, awards were made to the crews of the ships on duty off the Ethiopian coast during the campaign.

Description
It was designed by Joseph and Alfred Wyon, and struck at the Royal Mint. The medal is unique in that the recipient's name and unit were embossed on the reverse. This feature required that the dies for the reverse had a removable centre, so each recipient's name and unit could be impressed, with each medal minted individually. However, most medals awarded to Indian troops had impressed naming. 

The obverse bears the left facing effigy of a diademed Queen Victoria. Around the edge is a stylised border with indentions, between the indentions are the letters ABYSSINIA. The bust is similar to that on the New Zealand Medal issued in the same year.

The reverse has a blank central space for the recipient's name and unit, surrounded by a laurel wreath. 

The medal is held by a ring suspension attached to a crown surmounting the medal.

References

British campaign medals
1869 establishments in the United Kingdom
British Expedition to Abyssinia
Awards established in 1869
Awards disestablished in 1869